Thunder and Lightning are a duo of superpowered brothers published by DC Comics that had encounters with the Teen Titans.

They are not to be confused with the two superheroines Thunder and Lightning, sisters introduced at different times, who are the daughters of Black Lightning.

Publication history
Thunder and Lightning first appeared in New Teen Titans #32 and was created by Marv Wolfman and George Pérez.

Fictional character biography
Gan and Tavis Williams are twin brothers that were born of an unnamed Vietnamese woman and an American soldier named Second Lt. Walter Williams. Originally conjoined twins, they were separated with magic. As children, they found themselves beginning to manifest superpowers, but they had little control over these powers, and without an infusion of their father's blood, they would quickly burn themselves out. So, they took the aliases Thunder and Lightning, respectively, and set off to America to search for their father. They caused major disturbances in St. Louis and engaged in battle against the Teen Titans. After their aims were revealed, the Titans decided to help the pair.

Months later, the Teen Titans and S.T.A.R. Labs were working on a cure for Thunder and Lightning's powers. At the same time, Raven, using her powers, discovered that their father was actually an alien who had crash landed in Cambodia six hundred years ago, and was currently being held prisoner by the H.I.V.E. as they tried to exploit knowledge from him. When they located him, H.I.V.E. controlled the alien in a fight against Thunder and Lightning and the Teen Titans. In the end, Thunder and Lightning were forced to kill their own father to protect their new friends. A blood transfusion from their father allowed S.T.A.R. Labs to create the cure that would allow Thunder and Lightning to control their powers.

Thunder and Lightning resettled in San Francisco, where S.T.A.R Labs helped them control their powers. While there, they helped stop the Atomic Skull. They worked as security guards for S.T.A.R. until Trigon briefly took control of them. They were captured and held in stasis at S.T.A.R. Labs until they could be free from the demon seeds.

At some point they were freed of the seeds, as the two of them later returned to help the Titans battle the Justice League, via transport arranged from the ultra-powerful Cyborg. Thunder and Lightning came in too late to actually fight any of the Justice League but they still assisted in neutralizing the threat posed by Cyborg. After that, they returned to Southern Vietnam to defend it from an unknown alien threat.

During the "Infinite Crisis" storyline, they were subdued by the League of Assassins in Vietnam who were being paid to break open a prison as part of a worldwide scheme to attack Metropolis with dozens of supervillains.

During the Salvation Run storyline, Thunder and Lightning arrive to give food to Martian Manhunter. Martian Manhunter asks why they are here on this planet. When they offered to help Martian Manhunter, Bane attacks them. Despite being shocked by Lightning, Bane defeats the both of them as Lex Luthor arrives. Luthor keeps the two alive, later using them as power sources for his teleporter. The two are seemingly killed when the teleporter device self-destructs.

In September 2011, The New 52 rebooted DC's continuity. In this new timeline, Thunder and Lightning are reintroduced as part of The Ravagers, a superhero team which also includes Beast Boy, Terra, Ridge, and Fairchild.

Powers and abilities
Thunder is able to control thunder as he manifests as rumbling noises which he can control to varying degrees. Lightning is able to release bolts of electricity and harness lightning. The two have a psychic link that allows them to communicate with each other.

Other versions

Superman villains

An unrelated Thunder and Lightning appeared as Superman villains in Superman #303 (September 1976). These were actually two entities in the body of a sentient android used by a super-villain called Whirlicane (who had previously fought Superman in Action Comics #457), who wanted to conduct a series of terror acts across the US. Not knowing about his android origin, Thunder/Lightning hoped for his release by Whirlicane when his tasks were finally fulfilled, but then Superman exposed the truth. Going mad over the realization, Thunder/Lightning released a massive lightning burst, destroying himself, Whirlicane and his base; Superman escaped unscathed.

In other media
 A variation of Thunder and Lightning appear in Teen Titans, voiced by S. Scott Bullock and Quinton Flynn respectively. This version of the duo are brothers of unknown origin who want to have fun, but initially disregard others' safety, and wear samurai-like armor. Furthermore, in addition to their comic book powers, they can fly, with the reasonable Thunder conjuring a cloud-like platform while the rebellious Lightning can transmute his lower body into a lightning bolt, teleport, and create rain by combining their powers. Introduced in the episode "Forces of Nature", Thunder and Lightning clash with the Teen Titans while finding ways to have fun in Jump City, during which Beast Boy convinces Thunder to see the error of his ways. After the brothers are tricked by Slade into creating a fire monster to attack Jump City and Thunder convincing Lightning to see things his way, the brothers create a rain storm to stop the fire monster. In season five, Thunder and Lightning join the Titans, among other young heroes, in defeating the Brotherhood of Evil.
 The Teen Titans animated series incarnations of Thunder and Lightning appear in Teen Titans Go! issue #6.

References

External links
 Thunder and Lightning at Titan's Tower

DC Comics metahumans
DC Comics superheroes
Comics characters introduced in 1983
DC Comics superhero teams 
DC Comics characters who can teleport 
DC Comics characters who have mental powers
Fictional characters with electric or magnetic abilities
Fictional characters with weather abilities
Fictional Buddhists
Twin characters in comics
Animated duos
Superhero duos
Characters created by George Pérez
Characters created by Marv Wolfman